OM-85 or OM85 (trade name Broncho-Vaxom) is an immunostimulant. It is a combination of molecules extracted from the walls of bacteria that commonly cause respiratory infections.

Uses 
It has been sold, as Broncho-Vaxom, in Europe and some South American countries. It is used for children with asthma or recurrent respiratory infections.

Potential uses 
It may help prevent Covid-19.

It may prevent babies from developing asthma.

Composition 

It is a mix of lipopolysaccharides, extracted from bacteria cell walls.

Clinical trials 
It has been studied in numerous pediatric clinical trials.

References 

Immunostimulants
Asthma